Judicaël Cancoriet (born 25 April 1996) is a French rugby union player. His position is Flanker and he currently plays for ASM Clermont Auvergne in the Top 14. He began his career at RC Massy.

References

External links

ASM Clermont profile

1996 births
Living people
French rugby union players
France international rugby union players
ASM Clermont Auvergne players
Rugby union flankers
RC Massy players
People from Sarcelles
Sportspeople from Val-d'Oise
Black French sportspeople